Novoburanovo is a rural locality (a selo) and the administrative center of Novoburanovsky Selsoviet, Ust-Kalmansky District, Altai Krai, Russia. The population was 774 as of 2013. There are 18 streets.

Geography 
Novoburanovo is located 36 km southwest of Ust-Kalmanka (the district's administrative centre) by road. Yeltsovka is the nearest rural locality.

References 

Rural localities in Ust-Kalmansky District